Buckland Monachorum is a village and civil parish in the West Devon district of Devon, England, situated on the River Tavy, about 10 miles north of Plymouth.

In 2006 the neighbourhood had an estimated 1,511 residents and 654 dwellings. The electoral ward of the same name gave a population of 3,380 at the 2011 census.

Domesday Book (1086) records Buckland Monachorum (Bocheland) as having 46 households, land for 15 ploughs, a salt pan and a fishery.  It was in the possession of William de Poilley, one of 17 estates he held in southern Devon as a tenant-in-chief of William the Conqueror.

Near to Buckland Monachorum is Buckland Abbey, home of Sir Francis Drake during the Elizabethan era. The village is the site of St Andrew's, a 12th-century church with a Saxon baptismal font and the tombs of the Drake family and Lord Heathfield, the defender of Gibraltar, many historic buildings, and a complex of interesting gardens, known as "The Garden House". The Gift House, a seventeenth-century Almshouse, was built by a descendant of Sir Francis Drake.

The Drake Manor Inn - a public house, restaurant and B&B - is also situated in the village. A general store and Post Office was situated in the village until 2003. St Andrew's C of E Primary School is located in the village, providing education for around 200 pupils from the local area. In 2007 Ofsted judged the school 'outstanding'.

Nearby villages include:
 Yelverton
 Crapstone
 Milton Combe

Notable people

 Seth Lakeman, Sam Lakeman and Sean Lakeman, folk musicians who grew up as brothers in the village.

References

External links

 Buckland Monachorum Parish Council
 Buckland Monachorum
 St Andrew's Church of England

Villages in Devon